Israel participated in the 1958 Asian Games held in Tokyo, Japan, from 24 May to 1 June 1958. Following the 1958 games, Israel was unable to participate again until the 1966 Asian Games because during the 1962 Asian Games the host country Indonesia, refused to permit the participation of Israel due to political reasons, stating it would cause issues with their relationship with the Arab states.

Medals

Athletics

Medal table

Men

Football

Preliminary round - Group D

Standings

Matches

Knockout round

Standings

Bracket

Matches

References

Nations at the 1958 Asian Games
1958
Asian Games